Caucayá Airport  is an airport serving the river town of Puerto Leguízamo in the Putumayo Department of Colombia. Puerto Leguízamo is on the Putumayo River, locally the border with Peru.

The Puerto Leguizamo VOR-DME (Ident: PLG) is located on the field.

Airlines and destinations

See also
Transport in Colombia
List of airports in Colombia

References

External links
OpenStreetMap - Caucayá
OurAirports - Caucayá
SkyVector - Caucayá
FallingRain - Caucayá Airport
Google Maps - Puerto Leguízamo

Airports in Colombia
Buildings and structures in Putumayo Department